Frederick Bristol Buckingham (February 13, 1876 – December 3, 1948) was a Major League Baseball pitcher. Buckingham played for the Washington Senators in the 1895 season. He played just one game in his career, pitching in 3 innings, with a 6.00 ERA.

Buckingham attended Yale University. 
 
Buckingham was born in Blenheim, New York and died in Washington, D.C.

References

External links

Washington Senators (1891–1899) players
1876 births
1948 deaths
Baseball players from New York (state)
Yale University alumni
19th-century baseball players